Manaivikku Mariyadhai is a 1999 Tamil language film directed by V. C. Guhunathan and produced by Ramasamy. The film featured Pandiarajan alongside Khushbu, while Manivannan plays a supporting role. The film, which had music composed by Sirpy, opened in October 1999.

Plot
Pandiarajan wants to marry a housewife. Kushboo loves and marries Pandiarajan because of her father's betrayal towards his family. Pandiarajan makes her as a housewife and earns money and continue being the breadwinner of the family.

One fine day, his office got bankrupt and his job was gone. Kushboo volunteeringly accepts to go for a job. Her boss Ranjith likes her and tries to force her to marry him. She didn't accept so Ranjith forcefully kidnaps her and try to rape her in the moving van. Pandiarajan comes in time to rescue his wife bashes all of Ranjith’s henchmen and at last celebrates his first night in the moving lift. The climax was a bit comedic compared to the usual ending.

Cast
Pandiarajan as Pandiyan
Khushbu
Manivannan
Vadivelu as Rajappa
Ranjith as Naresh
S. N. Lakshmi
Kovai Sarala

Soundtrack
The music was composed by Sirpy.

References

1999 films
1990s Tamil-language films
Indian comedy-drama films
Films scored by Sirpy
Films directed by V. C. Guhanathan